Maria Cornejo is a Chilean-born fashion designer based in New York and known for her Zero + Maria Cornejo collection.

Biography 
Maria Cornejo was born in Chile. When she was 12 years old, she and her family moved to Manchester, England during Pinochet's dictatorship.  Cornejo graduated from Ravensbourne College in London in 1984.

In 1996, Cornejo and her family moved to New York where, in 1998, she transformed a raw space in Nolita into a creative atelier and store known as Zero + Maria Cornejo.

Clients 
Cornejo's clients include Michelle Obama, Tilda Swinton, Christy Turlington and Cindy Sherman.

Honors 
Cornejo was the Fashion Prize winner of the 2006 Smithsonian Cooper Hewitt National Design Awards after being selected as a finalist in 2005. Cornejo has been a member of the Council of Fashion Designers of America (CFDA) since 2003 and an original member of the CFDA Sustainability Committee. In 2010, Cornejo won the first CFDA Lexus Eco Fashion Challenge and in 2017 was awarded one of the top three prizes in the CFDA + Lexus Fashion* Initiative, a 17-month long business development program aimed at accomplishing measurable sustainability changes within the business. In 2018, Cornejo was honored with the Fashion Group International’s Sustainability Award at their Night of the Stars Gala in New York City. In 2019, Cornejo was appointed to the CFDA board of directors by the new chairman, Tom Ford.

References

External links 
 Zero + Maria Cornejo Website
 CFDA
 Instagram
 Facebook
 Twitter
 Tumblr

Living people
American fashion designers
American women fashion designers
English fashion designers
British women fashion designers
Chilean emigrants to England
Chilean emigrants to the United States
English emigrants to the United States
Artists from Manchester
Artists from London
Alumni of Ravensbourne University London
Year of birth missing (living people)
21st-century American women